Yermek Satybaldyyevich Baiduashov (Ermek Satybaldyūly Baiduaşov; born July 20, 1982 in Shymkent) is an amateur Kazakh freestyle wrestler, who played for the men's light heavyweight category. He won a bronze medal for his division at the 2010 Asian Games in Guangzhou, China.

Baiduashov represented Kazakhstan at the 2012 Summer Olympics in London, where he competed for the men's 84 kg class. He lost the qualifying match to Iran's Ehsan Lashgari, who was able to score five points in two straight periods, leaving Baiduashov without a single point.

References

External links
Profile – International Wrestling Database
NBC Olympics Profile

1982 births
Living people
Olympic wrestlers of Kazakhstan
Wrestlers at the 2012 Summer Olympics
People from Shymkent
Asian Games medalists in wrestling
Wrestlers at the 2010 Asian Games
Kazakhstani male sport wrestlers
Asian Games bronze medalists for Kazakhstan

Medalists at the 2010 Asian Games
21st-century Kazakhstani people